Irene Marie Giblin (August 12, 1888 – May 12, 1974), also known as Irene Giblin O'Brien, was an American pianist and composer of ragtime. She published a total of ten pieces between 1905 and 1911. Her song "Chicken Chowder" of 1905 was her biggest success.

Early life 

Irene M. Giblin was born to Richard T. Giblin, a printer, and Nora Reardon Giblin in 1888, in St. Louis, Missouri. She was the eldest of six children.

Music 
Giblin was a popular young woman in the Irish-American community in St. Louis. She worked at music stores Grand Leader and Stix, Baer and Fuller, playing the piano for several hours a day to convince the customers to buy the latest scores.

Giblin published a total of ten ragtime songs over a period of six years, from 1905 to 1911. Among them, "Sleepy Lou" and "The Aviator Rag" were popular sellers. However, it was her first rag, "Chicken Chowder" (1905) that was her most successful. She published her last rag in 1911, "The Dixie Rag".

Personal life 
Giblin married Edward Patrick O'Brien, an accountant for the Missouri Pacific Railway Company, in 1908. They had two sons: Richard in 1911 and Edward Jr. in 1915.  Her husband died in 1958; Irene Giblin O'Brien died in 1974, at the age of 85 years, in St. Louis, Missouri.

In 2018, the San Francisco Conservatory of Music marked the 150th birthday of Scott Joplin, along with the 130th birthdays of May Aufderheide and Irene Giblin, with a special concert of their works.

List of compositions 

1905
 Quit, You're Kidding
 Chicken Chowder – Characteristic Two-Step

1906
 Sleepy Lou – A Raggy Two-Step
 Soap Suds – March Two-Step Characteristic

1908
 Black Feather – Two-Step
 Pickaninny Rag
 
1910
 The Aviator Rag
 Columbia Rag
 Ketchup Rag

1911
 The Dixie Rag

References

External links 

MIDI of Giblin's compositions

1888 births
1974 deaths
American composers
People from St. Louis